Wang Xiaohong (born 11 July 1957) is a senior police officer and politician of China who is serving as a secretary of the Secretariat of the Chinese Communist Party, a state councilor of China, and the Minister of Public Security. He was chief of Beijing Municipal Public Security Bureau from 2015 to 2020.

Early life and education
Wang Xiaohong was born in Fuzhou, Fujian. He joined the workforce in July 1974 and joined the Chinese Communist Party (CCP) in December 1982. He graduated from People's Public Security University of China and CCP Central Party School.

Career in Fujian
In August 1993, he was appointed deputy chief and deputy party secretary of Fuzhou Municipal Public Security Bureau. Since February 1998, he was promoted to chief of Fuzhou Municipal Public Security Bureau and then chief of Zhangzhou Municipal Public Security Bureau.

In May 2002, he became deputy director of Fujian Provincial Public Security Department. In September 2011, he was appointed as the deputy mayor of Xiamen and chief of Xiamen Municipal Public Security Bureau.

Career in Henan
In August 2013, became assistant governor Henan and director of Henan Provincial Public Security Department. In December 2014, he became deputy governor Henan.

Career in Beijing
In March 2015, he was appointed deputy mayor of Beijing and chief of Beijing Municipal Public Security Bureau. In May 2016, he was appointed as deputy minister of Ministry of Public Security and concurrently deputy mayor of Beijing and Bureau Chief of Beijing Municipal Public Security Bureau. In May 2017, he was confirmed as a minister-level official. On October 24, 2017, at 19th National Congress of the Chinese Communist Party, he was elected as a member of the 19th Central Committee of the Chinese Communist Party. On January 30, 2018, he resigned from his post as deputy mayor of Beijing. He remained a full member of the 20th Central Committee of the Chinese Communist Party.

Career in the Ministry of Public Security
In March 2018, Wang Xiaohong became deputy party secretary and deputy minister of the Ministry of Public Security, person in charge work day-to-day (minister-level official). On April 24, 2020, Wang Xiaohong was no longer chief of Beijing Municipal Public Security Bureau. On 19 November 2021, he rose to become party secretary of the Ministry of Public Security, succeeding Zhao Kezhi.

References 

1957 births
Living people
Central Party School of the Chinese Communist Party alumni
Chinese Communist Party politicians from Fujian
Chinese People's Public Security University alumni
Chinese police officers
Delegates to the 14th National People's Congress
Members of the 19th Central Committee of the Chinese Communist Party
Members of the 20th Central Committee of the Chinese Communist Party
Ministers of Public Security of the People's Republic of China
People from Fuzhou
People's Republic of China politicians from Fujian